Within mathematics regarding differential equations, L-stability is a special case of  A-stability, a property of Runge–Kutta methods for solving  ordinary differential equations.
L-stable methods are in general very good at integrating stiff equations.

References 
 .

Numerical differential equations